Rollan Pohoreltsev; Rollan Pogoreltsev (born 16 July 1990) is a Ukrainian-born Russian former football defender.

Club career
Pohoreltsev began his playing career with Shakhtar Donetsk's youth team. Than he spent some years in Shakhtar Donetsk football system. His first trainer was N. Lanchak. Than Pohoreltsev played for some Crimean teams of different levels, and in February 2010 he signed two years deal with FC Krymteplytsia, but next year become SC Tavriya's player.

In the debut of the Crimea championship soccer match for TSC scored the second goal of the Sevastopol SKChF.

References

External links 
 

Ukrainian footballers
Ukrainian footballers banned from domestic competitions
Ukrainian Premier League players
Ukrainian First League players
Ukrainian Second League players
FC Ihroservice Simferopol players
FC Spartak Molodizhne players
FC Krymteplytsia Molodizhne players
SC Tavriya Simferopol players
FC Shakhtar Sverdlovsk players
FC Feniks-Illichovets Kalinine players
FC Karlivka players
1990 births
Living people
People from Saky
Naturalised citizens of Russia
Russian footballers
Association football defenders
Crimean Premier League players
FC TSK Simferopol players
FC Neftekhimik Nizhnekamsk players
FC Spartak-UGP Anapa players